The 1976 Grote Prijs Jef Scherens was the 12th edition of the Grote Prijs Jef Scherens cycle race and was held on 19 September 1976. The race started and finished in Leuven. The race was won by Frans Verbeeck.

General classification

References

1976
1976 in road cycling
1976 in Belgian sport